Robert Orr Harris (November 8, 1854 – June 13, 1926) was a U.S. Representative from Massachusetts, son of Benjamin Winslow Harris.

Born in Boston, Massachusetts, Harris attended the common schools and Phillips Exeter Academy, Exeter, New Hampshire.
He graduated from Harvard in 1877.
He studied law.
He was admitted to the bar in 1879 and practiced in Boston and Brockton, Massachusetts from 1879 to 1902.
He served as member of the State house of representatives in 1889.
He served as district attorney for the southeastern district of Massachusetts 1891-1901.
He served as associate judge of the superior court of Massachusetts from June 4, 1902, to March 1, 1911.

Harris was elected as a Republican to the Sixty-second Congress (March 4, 1911 – March 3, 1913).
He was not a candidate for renomination in 1912.
He resumed the practice of law.
He was appointed United States district attorney for the Massachusetts district by President Harding in 1921 and served until removed by President Coolidge in December 1924.
He died in Brockton, Massachusetts, June 13, 1926.
He was interred in Central Cemetery, East Bridgewater, Massachusetts.

References

1854 births
1926 deaths
Harvard University alumni
Republican Party members of the Massachusetts House of Representatives
District attorneys in Norfolk County, Massachusetts
District attorneys in Plymouth County, Massachusetts
United States Attorneys for the District of Massachusetts
Phillips Exeter Academy alumni
Republican Party members of the United States House of Representatives from Massachusetts